Bickel may refer to:

Alexander Bickel (1924–1974), American law professor
Alfred Bickel (1918–1999), Swiss football player and coach
Balthasar Bickel (born 1965), Swiss linguist
Charles Bickel (1852–1921), American architect
Christian Bickel (born 1991), German football player
Horst Bickel (1918–2000), German doctor
Moidele Bickel (1937–2016), German costume designer
Peter J. Bickel (born 1940),  American statistician
Stu Bickel (born 1986), American ice hockey defenceman
Susanne Bickel (born 1960), Swiss Egyptologist
Thomas Bickel (born 1963), Swiss football midfielder
Warren Bickel, American pharmacologist
Wolf Bickel, German astronomer